Agioi Theodoroi railway station is a train station in Agioi Theodoroi, Corinthia, Greece. It was opened on 27 September 2005 as part of the extension of the Athens Airport–Patras railway to Corinth.

History
The station opened on 27 September 2005 as part of the extension of the Athens Airport–Patras railway to Corinth. In 2008, all Athens Suburban Railway services were transferred from OSE to TrainOSE. In 2017 OSE's passenger transport sector was privatised as TrainOSE, currently, a wholly-owned subsidiary of Ferrovie dello Stato Italiane infrastructure, including stations, remained under the control of OSE. In July 2022, the station began being served by Hellenic Train, the rebranded TranOSE.

Services

Since 15 May 2022, the following weekday services call at this station:

See also
Railway stations in Greece
Hellenic Railways Organization
Hellenic Train
Proastiakos

References

Railway stations in Corinthia
Railway stations opened in 2005
Buildings and structures in Corinthia